"That's the Way It Is" is a song by British pop duo Mel and Kim that was featured on the soundtrack album of Coming to America, starring Eddie Murphy. The song was written and produced by Stock Aitken Waterman (SAW). The single peaked at #10 in the UK, becoming their fourth consecutive top 10 hit.

Background and release
By the time of the single's release, Melanie Appleby had been diagnosed with cancer and had withdrawn from the public eye in mid-1987. Appleby discharged herself from hospital to record the vocals for the track, with the singer keen for a return to normality and the distraction of a creative outlet after months of rigorous treatment.

The sisters made Mel's illness public at the time of the release of this single, and both appeared on the Wogan show in April 1988 while Mel was still undergoing treatment, as part of European Cancer Week.

The B-side of the single was a new song, "You Changed My Life", which was the first song on which the sisters had a co-writer credit. Written by the siblings during Mel's treatment, the pair submitted it to SAW as a potential single.

"That's the Way It Is" was not included on the group's debut album, F.L.M.. It has been included on later compilation albums of the duo, along with "You Changed My Life", with both tracks appearing on the 2010 deluxe edition re-issue of F.L.M.

Due to Mel's illness, the sisters did not appear in the promotional videoclip for the song. Instead, it featured a team of dancers in a studio, much like the video clip of their previous single. A second music video for the song was also released. combining footage of the dancers from the first video for the song with footage from the sisters' earlier music videos and a live performance of "F.L.M.".

It would be the last release by the duo, as they disappeared from the public eye again while Mel Appleby continued her cancer treatment. She succumbed to pneumonia in January 1990, her immune system weakened by chemotherapy. Some of the songs she co-wrote with Kim Appleby during the last two years of her life were later released on Kim's debut solo album, released in late 1990.

Critical reception
Jerry Smith of Music Week considered "That's the Way It Is" as continuing the SAW "successful formula" and predicted a "big hit with this slick, insistent dance track". Johnny Dee from Record Mirror said, "Innocuous rubbish from the conveyor belt studio. When this pair first appeared and went all bendy in their videos they did something to me I just can't explain in words of more than one syllable. But now the SAW formula has been worked until it's blue in the face and this song sounds all too familiar. Sure, its going to be a top five hit, but it will turn teenage brains into shaving foam." The magazine's James Hamilton wrote in his dance column, "Brightly thrashing enthusiastic bpm flier, more beefily pounding than usual but you can still sing "FLM" in place of the new staccato title line".

UK releases

 7" (SUPE 117)
 "That's the Way It Is" 3:25
 "You Changed My Life" 3:21

 12" (SUPE T 117 / RCA PT 41832)
 "That's the Way It Is" (12"/Club mix) 6:47
 "I'm the One Who Really Loves You" (US remix) 5:57
 "You Changed My Life" 3:21

 12" picture disc (SUPE TP 117)
 "That's the Way It Is" (12"/Club mix) 6:47
 "I'm the One Who Really Loves You" (US remix) 5:57
 "You Changed My Life" 3:21

 12" remix (SUPE TX 117)
 "That's the Way It Is" (House remix/Special mix) 6:42
 "I'm the One Who Really Loves You" (US remix) 5:57
 "You Changed My Life" 3:21

 12" remix (SUPE TZ 117)
 "That's the Way It Is" (Acid House mix) 7:38
 "That's the Way It Is" (Acid dub)
 "You Changed My Life" 3:21

 CD single (SUPCD 117)
 "That's the Way It Is" (12"/Club mix) 6:47
 "I'm the One Who Really Loves You" (US mix) 5:57
 "You Changed My Life" 3:21

Official mixes
 Album/7" version 3:25
 12"/Club mix 6:47
 House remix/Special mix 6:42
 Acid House mix 7:38
 Acid dub

Charts

Weekly charts

Year-end charts

References

1988 singles
Mel and Kim songs
Song recordings produced by Stock Aitken Waterman
Songs written by Mike Stock (musician)
Songs written by Matt Aitken
Songs written by Pete Waterman
1988 songs
PolyGram singles
Supreme Records singles
Songs with feminist themes